The 1968 United States Senate election in Maryland was held on November 5, 1968. Incumbent Democratic U.S. Senator Daniel Brewster ran for re-election to a second term in office but was defeated by Republican U.S. Representative Charles Mathias.
Mathias may have benefited from the campaign of George P. Mahoney, the 1966 Democratic nominee for Governor of Maryland, who ran on the George Wallace American Independent ticket and garnered a significant chunk of the vote.

Democratic primary

Candidates
Daniel Brewster, incumbent Senator since 1963
Wayne Gilchrist Finch, Baltimore patent lawyer
Richard R. Howes
Ross Zimmerman Pierpont, Timonium surgeon

Results

Republican primary

Candidates
Charles Mathias, U.S. Representative from Frederick
Harry L. Simms, candidate for Senate in 1962
Paul F. Wattay

Results

General election

Results

See also 
 1968 United States Senate elections

References 

Maryland
1968
United States Senate